Pilots on the Way Home is a 2014 Estonian animated film directed by Priit Pärn and Olga Pärn.

Plot
The film tells the story about three pilots during their journey to the home. The journey is long and hard due to harsh climate conditions. But when the pilots rest in the night, the fantastical and erotic actions take place.

Awards
 2014: Fredrikstad Animation Festival (Norway), Grand Prix
 2014: annual award by Cultural Endowment of Estonia (best film of the year)
 2014: PÖFF: Animated Dreams (Tallinn), best audiodesign

References

External links
 
 Lendurid koduteel, entry in Estonian Film Database (EFIS)

2014 films
Estonian animated short films
Estonian-language films